The Rhode Island Avenue Trolley Trail (formerly known as the College Park Trolley Trail) is a  long rail trail within the Cities of College Park Maryland, Riverdale Park Maryland and Hyattsville Maryland.

Description

The trail is built on part of the abandoned right-of-way of the City and Suburban Railway.  On the southern end, the trail begins at the end of Rhode Island Avenue, where it intersects with Farragut Street in Hyattsville. It then travels along the west side of the railroad tracks into the town of Riverdale Park, to the Riverdale Park Railroad station before moving away from the railroad through the "Riverdale Park Station" mixed-use development. It then crosses into the town of College Park and follows the right-of-way alongside and through the median of existing sections of Rhode Island Avenue to Calvert Street, where it becomes a sidepath alongside the avenue. At Rossborough lane, the trail resumes and, across Campus Drive, it is shared by the Paint Branch Trail of the Anacostia Tributary Trail System for a short distance. The trail is on-road between Pierce Avenue and Berwyn House Road before resuming. The last piece of trail passes through the Berwyn Neighborhood Playground on its way to the northern trailhead at Greenbelt Road.

The north end from Paducah St/Edgewood Rd to Greenbelt Rd in College Park is no longer considered part of the Trolley Trail, as it is a fully on-road bike lane. Similarly, the south end dedicated trail extension, from Farragut St to Charles Armentrout Drive in Hyattsville, is planned to connect with the Anacostia River Trail and the Northwest Branch Trail, is not yet a functional section of the trail as there is no on-road sharrow signage.

History

The right of way was originally Route 82 of the streetcar system of Washington, DC. The section used by the trail was built by the City and Suburban Railway in 1899. The full line stretched from New York Avenue and 15th St NW in Washington, DC to Berwyn at Greenbelt Road, where a turn table was built and was extended to Laurel, Maryland in 1902. City and Suburban operated cars on the line until 1926 when it was absorbed by the Washington Railway and Electric Company which in 1933 became part of Capital Transit and in 1955 DC Transit. During that time the line was shortened, running only to Beltsville by 1948 and only to Berwyn by 1956. In 1956, Congress decided to replace the streetcars with buses and on September 7, 1958 the last streetcar ran the route.

In 2007, a third section south of the existing trail from Calvert Road to Albion Road in Riverdale Park opened. This part was originally called the College Park Trolley Trail. Then in 2008 a plan was formed to extend the trail south to Riverdale and Hyattsville and rebrand it as the Rhode Island Avenue Trolley Trail.

In 2012 work on the southern extension began with a five block long section from Madison to Hamilton in Hyattsville which was built as part of the EYA Arts District development. In 2014 that section was extended south to Farragut and north to Queensberry road by M-NCPPC. By 2016, that segment was extended north to Tuckerman Street. 

In November 2017, the first of the Riverdale Station sections, from Albion Road to 47th Street and from Tuckerman to just south of Van Buren opened. In November 2018, the short section from 47th Street to Woodberry Street in Hyattsville was completed and opened. In 2020-2021, the one block section from Van Buren to Woodbury was finished, completing the Riverdale Station section and creating one complete trail from Farragut Street in Hyattsville to Greenbelt Road in College Park. 

During the construction of the southern portion, parts of the northern portion were improved. In 2011, a new trail crossing at Campus Drive was constructed. In 2013, the trail gap between Calvert Road and Campus Drive was closed when a segment was built as a sidepath along Rhode Island Avenue. In early 2017, a section of the sound barrier south of Campus Drive was removed to allow the trail to pass straight through rather than divert around the barrier.

The final sections, from Farragut Street to Charles Armentrout Drive in Hyattsville, as well as the Greenbelt Rd-University Boulevard pedestrian-crossing extension in College Park, are still in the planning phase.

In late 2017, wayfinding signage kiosks and a formal website were created.

References

External links
Video of the Route 82 Streetcar
traillink Rhode Island Avenue Trolley Trail

Rail trails in Maryland
Protected areas of Prince George's County, Maryland
College Park, Maryland
Transportation in Prince George's County, Maryland
2002 establishments in Maryland